Kunova (or Kanaberg) is a dispersed village in the hills south of Gornja Radgona in northeastern Slovenia.

References

External links
Kunova on Geopedia

Populated places in the Municipality of Gornja Radgona